Bothriomyrmex saundersi is a species of ant in the genus Bothriomyrmex. Described by Santschi in 1922, the species is endemic to Portugal and Spain.

References

External links

Bothriomyrmex
Hymenoptera of Europe
Insects described in 1922